Chamaesphecia proximata is a moth of the family Sesiidae. It is found in Serbia and Montenegro, Bulgaria, the Republic of Macedonia, Albania, Greece, Cyprus, Asia Minor, Armenia, Lebanon and Iraq.

The larvae feed on Salvia sclarea.

References

Moths described in 1891
Sesiidae
Moths of Europe
Moths of Asia